The Dr. Ambedkar National Award or the Dr. Ambedkar National Award for Social Understanding and Upliftment of Weaker Sections is a national award presented by the Government of India in honour of B. R. Ambedkar, the country's first law minister, father of the Indian Constitution and champion of human rights.

History
It was established in 1992 and is administered by the Dr. Ambedkar foundation to people or organizations for their outstanding work. The award symbolizes the vision of Babasaheb Ambedkar for social understanding 
and national integrity.  The money constituent of this award is 1 million (10 Lakhs) rupees and a citation. This award is provided by the hands of the President of India.

Recipients
The following people or organizations have received this award.

See also
 List of awards and prizes named after B. R. Ambedkar
 Dr. Ambedkar International Award
 Dr. B. R. Ambedkar National Award

References

Indian awards
Awards established in 1992
Memorials to B. R. Ambedkar
Orders, decorations, and medals of India